Wiborg is an unincorporated community and  coal town in McCreary County, Kentucky, United States. Their post office closed in 1988.

References

Unincorporated communities in McCreary County, Kentucky
Unincorporated communities in Kentucky
Coal towns in Kentucky